Arthur Herbert Taylor (February 29, 1852 – February 20, 1922) was an American lawyer and politician who served one term as a U.S. Representative from Indiana from 1893 to 1895.

Biography 
Born at Caledonia Springs, Ontario, Canada, Taylor moved with his parents to Yates County, New York, in 1856.  He attended the local school.  He taught school for several years, and then moved to Indianapolis, Indiana in 1869 to study law.  He was admitted to the bar in 1873 and commenced practice in Indianapolis, Indiana.  He moved to Petersburg, Indiana, in 1874 and continued the practice of law.  He served as prosecuting attorney for the eleventh judicial circuit of Indiana 1880–1884.

Congress 
Taylor was elected as a Democrat to the Fifty-third Congress (March 4, 1893 – March 3, 1895).  He was an unsuccessful candidate for reelection in 1894 to the Fifty-fourth Congress.

Later career and death 
He resumed the practice of law in Petersburg, Indiana, until his death February 20, 1922.  He was interred in Walnut Hill Cemetery.

References 

1852 births
1922 deaths
Pre-Confederation Canadian emigrants to the United States
American prosecutors
People from the United Counties of Prescott and Russell
Democratic Party members of the United States House of Representatives from Indiana
People from Petersburg, Indiana